Cortober is a village and townland in County Roscommon, Ireland. It is located across the bridge from the town of Carrick-on-Shannon on the right bank of the River Shannon. It is bounded on the north by the parish of Tumna and River Shannon, on the east by the River Shannon, on the south by the townland of Cordrehead and Killukin and on the west by Mullaghmore.

Hollywell House
A St. George Estate Rental map for 1768 shows that the Hollywell House was then occupied by small cabins that surrounded the original 1623 fort of Liberty Hill, owned by Harris, Jones and King Families.  Another Rental of Charles Manners St. George Estate, dated 1842, gives a list of some early residents of Cortober townland, including Andersons, Armstrongs, Backhouses and Bournes.  These St. George Rentals confirm that Cortober was an integral part of the family land holdings.

Transportation

Midland Great Western Railway
The Midland Great Western Railway built the Carrick on Shannon railway station in the townland, which was opened on 3 December 1862.

Roads
The N4 passes through the northern part of Cortober. From it, the R368 branches off towards the southwest and forms part of the western border of the townland.

The Rosary High School
In 1942 Ireland was emerging as a new nation. The country had experienced the Civil War, the Econimc War, and Europe was being ravaged by the Second World War slowly an infant education system was finding its feet. Here and there were schools founded and managed by people who were imbued with that pioneering spirit and generosity of mind which is so much part of the educator, seemingly scholastically brilliant. Outside the larger towns like Sligo and Longford there was no Secondary School available to the Carrick-on-Shannon area. Kathleen Lynch felt that there was a need for the establishment of a Secondary School to cater boys of neighbouring districts of North Roscommon and South Leitrim. On 8 September 1942 Kathleen Lynch, she was Mary Kathleen Mulhern of Drumlumman, opened the Rosary High School for boys at Cortober, on the Roscommon side of the Bridge as well as South Leitrim. The opening was performed by the Bishop of Elphin Most Rev. Dr. Edward Doorly.

References

Carrick-on-Shannon
Townlands of County Roscommon